1980 college football season may refer to:

 1980 NCAA Division I-A football season
 1980 NCAA Division I-AA football season
 1980 NCAA Division II football season
 1980 NCAA Division III football season
 1980 NAIA Division I football season
 1980 NAIA Division II football season